The Greatest Adventure: Stories from the Bible is an animated direct-to-video film series produced by Hanna-Barbera that tells of three young adventurers who travel back in time to watch biblical events take place. Thirteen videos were released between 1985 and 1992.

Overview
Derek and Margo, two young archaeologists, are on a dig accompanied by "their nomad friend", a boy named Moki. They come across a door in an ancient ruin that turns out to be a portal through time. Though the introduction is the same in all videos, each episode sends the three friends into a different story from the Bible. They often interact with principal figures from each story, but without any significant effect upon the plot so as not to alter the course of history; in other episodes, they arrive decades after the events depicted in the Bible and are relayed the story by a firsthand witness.

The episodes were not released in an order consistent with the Biblical chronology, but can be construed to give a coherent story beginning with "The Creation" and ending with "The Easter Story", which is told from a Christian viewpoint. The first six episodes, released simultaneously, relate Old Testament (Hebrew Bible) stories, with episodes pertaining to the life of Jesus being added among some additional Old Testament stories as the series progressed.

Each individual episode featured celebrity voices in principal Biblical roles.

Production and distribution
The series was initially conceived by Hanna-Barbera co-founder Joseph Barbera some seventeen years before it was produced, but he had difficulty in procuring support for the project. Eventually, however, Hanna-Barbera's parent company Taft Broadcasting agreed to provide funding, and the first video was released in 1985, then Turner Home Entertainment continued production after they bought Hanna-Barbera in 1991. Sparrow-Star Song assisted with distribution, releasing all thirteen episodes on VHS, one episode per tape. Five of these episodes ("The Miracles of Jesus", "David and Goliath", "Noah's Ark", "The Easter Story", and "Moses") were released on DVD in 2006.

Voice cast

Main

 Darleen Carr – Margo
 Darryl Hickman – Derek (1989–1992)
 Michael Rye – Narrator (main titles), Sebel (in "Samson and Delilah")
 Rob Paulsen – Moki
 Terry McGovern – Derek (1985–1989)

Special guest stars

 Adrienne Barbeau – Mary Magdalene (in "The Story of Easter"), Queen Vashti (in "Queen Esther")
 Alan Oppenheimer – Jonah (in "The Nativity")
 Barry Bostwick – Joseph (in "Joseph and his Brothers")
 Bruce McGill – 
 Charlotte Rae – Noah's Wife (in "Noah's Ark")
 David Ackroyd – Angel (in "The Nativity"), Jesus Christ (in "The Miracles of Jesus")
 Dean Jones – King Ahasuerus (in "Queen Esther")
 Ed Asner – Joshua (in "Joshua and the Battle of Jericho")
 Gavin MacLeod – Daniel (in "Daniel and the Lion's Den")
 Gregory Harrison – Joseph (in "The Nativity")
 Harold Gould – Benjamin (in "The Miracle of Jesus")
 Helen Hunt – Mary (in "The Nativity")
 Helen Slater – Queen Esther (in "Queen Esther")
 Herschel Bernardi – Goliath (in "David and Goliath")
 James Earl Jones – Pharaoh (in "Moses")
 James Whitmore – Moses (in "Moses")
 Jeffrey Tambor – Eli (in "The Nativity"), Peter ("The Easter Story")
 Joe Spano – Jesus (in "The Easter Story")
 John Randolph – 
 Les Tremayne – the Storyteller (in "The Creation"), God (in "The Creation")
 Linda Purl – Delilah (in "Samson and Delilah")
 Lorne Greene – Noah (in "Noah's Ark")
 Marc Singer – Adam (in "The Creation")
 Michael Constantine – 
 Perry King – Samson (in "Samson and Delilah")
 Richard Libertini – Apple Merchant (in "The Creation")
 Richard Thomas – Mark (in "The Easter Story")
 Robby Benson – David (in "David and Goliath")
 Ron Rifkin – Mordecai (in "Queen Esther")
 Roscoe Lee Browne – Magus (in "The Nativity")
 Stephanie Zimbalist – Eve (in "The Creation")
 Tim Curry – The Serpent (in "The Creation"), Judas Iscariot (in "The Easter Story")
 Vincent Price – King Herod (in "The Nativity")
 Werner Klemperer – Haman (in "Queen Esther")

Additional voices

 Alan Johnson – 
 Alan Oppenheimer – King Belshazarr (in "Daniel and the Lion's Den"), Melon Merchant (in "The Nativity"), Wise Man #2 (in "The Nativity")
 Allan Lurie – 
 Andre Stojka – Lead Heckler (in "Noah's Ark"), King Saul's Councilor (in "David and Goliath")
 B.J. Ward – Haman's Wife (in "Queen Esther")
 Barry Dennen – Senel (in "The Easter Story")
 Bernard Erhard – King Saul (in "David and Goliath")
 Bill Woodson – Simon (in "The Easter Story")
 Brock Peters – Priest (in "Samson and Delilah")
 David Mendenhall – Seth (in "The Creation")
 Dena Dietrich – King Belshzarr's Mother (in "Daniel and the Lion's Den")
 Dick Gautier – 
 Dorian Harewood – Roman Guard (in "The Easter Story")
 Ed Gilbert – Balak (in "The Easter Story"), Micah (in "Jonah")
 Frank Welker – Lions (in "Daniel and the Lion's Den"), Monkey (in "The Nativity"), Roman Soldier (in "The Nativity"), Soldier (in "Daniel and the Lion's Den")
 Fredrica Weber –
 George DiCenzo – 
 George Hearn – Retainer (in "Queen Esther")
 Henry Corden – Animal Wrangler (in "Daniel and the Lion's Den")
 Henry Polic II – Secal (in "Daniel and the Lion's Den")
 Jerry Dexter – 
 Joseph Ruskin –
 Keene Curtis – Pontius Pilate (in "The Easter Story")
 Kristoffer Tabori – Young Jonah (in "Jonah")
 Mariette Hartley – Rahab
 Michael Bell – Eliab (in "David and Goliath"), Philistine Soldier (in "David and Goliath")
 Michael Nouri – 
 Nancy Dussault – Martha (in "Jonah")
 Nicholas Guest – 
 Paul Eiding – 
 Paul Lukather – 
 Peter Cullen – King of Nineveh (in "Jonah"), Japeth (in "Noah's Ark")
 Peter Mark Richman – 
 Peter Renaday – 
 René Auberjonois – 
 Richard Dysart – 
 Richard Erdman – Egyptian Magician (in "Moses")
 Scott Grimes – Yasha (in "The Nativity")
 Stan Jones – 
 Tony Jay – Caiaphas (in "The Easter Story"), God (in "Jonah"), Jerusalem Man #3 (in "The Easter Story"), Man (in "Jonah")
 Vic Perrin –
 Virginia Gregg – Miriam (in "Samson and Delilah")
 William Wright – 
 Zale Kessler –

Episodes

References

External links
 Clips from the series
  
 
 DVDVerdict Review of David and Goliath
 DVDVerdict Review of Moses 
 
  
  
  
  
 
  
  
 
 The Greatest Adventure: Stories from the Bible at CEGAnMo.com
 
 

Film series introduced in 1985
Direct-to-video film series
1986 direct-to-video films
1987 direct-to-video films
1988 direct-to-video films
1989 direct-to-video films
1990 direct-to-video films
1991 direct-to-video films
1992 direct-to-video films
1992 films
1980s animated short films
1990s animated short films
Direct-to-video adventure films
Direct-to-video action films
Direct-to-video drama films
Children's film series
Christian animation
Animated films about time travel
Cultural depictions of Adam and Eve
Hanna-Barbera
Hanna-Barbera animated films
Nativity of Jesus on television
Film series based on the Bible
Direct-to-video television series
1980s American animated films
1990s American animated films
Films about archaeology